Mount Tipton is a mountain in northwestern Arizona in the United States. The community of Dolan Springs lies west at the base of Mount Tipton at the northwest side of the Cerbat Range.

See also 
 Cerbat Mountains
 List of mountain ranges of Arizona

References

External links 
 
 

Mountains of Arizona
Landforms of Mohave County, Arizona
Mountains of Mohave County, Arizona